Saroyan is a family name of Armenian origin. It may refer to:

 Camille Saroyan, a character in the TV series Bones
 Sedrak Saroyan (1967–2022), Armenian general and politician
 William Saroyan (1908–1981), Pulitzer Prize–winning Armenian-American author
 Carol Saroyan (1924–2003), American actress, wife of William Saroyan (twice) and Walter Matthau
 Aram Saroyan (born 1943), American poet, novelist, biographer, memoirist and playwright; son of William and Carol; father of Strawberry
 Strawberry Saroyan (born 1970), American journalist and author; daughter of Aram
 Lucy Saroyan (1945–2003), American actress; daughter of William and Carol

Armenian-language surnames